The 2004 Peterborough City Council election took place on 10 June 2004 to elect members of Peterborough City Council in England. This was on the same day as other local elections.

Election result

References

2004
2000s in Cambridgeshire
Peterborough